Williamsburg may refer to:

Places
Colonial Williamsburg, a living-history museum and private foundation in Virginia
Williamsburg, Brooklyn, neighborhood in New York City
Williamsburg, former name of Kernville (former town), California
Williamsburg, former name of Tehichipa, California
Williamsburg, Colorado
Williamsburg, Florida
Williamsburg, Calhoun County, Georgia
Williamsburg, Clinch County, Georgia
Williamsburg, Dunwoody, Georgia
 Williamsburg, Illinois
Williamsburg, Indiana
Williamsburg, Iowa
Williamsburg, Kansas
Williamsburg, Kentucky
Williamsburg, Maryland
Williamsburg, Massachusetts
Williamsburg, Michigan
Williamsburg, Mississippi
Williamsburg, Missouri
Williamsburg, New Mexico
Williamsburg, Ohio
Williamsburg, Ontario (see South Dundas, Ontario)
Williamsburg, Pennsylvania
Williamsburg, Tennessee, now known as Burwood, Tennessee
Williamsburg, Virginia, independent city
 Battle of Williamsburg (1775), during the American Revolutionary War
 Battle of Williamsburg, 1862, during the American Civil War
 Williamsburg, West Virginia
Williamsburg, Wisconsin, a ghost town

Other uses
Williamsburg (film), a 2006 independent American satirical drama
"Williamsburg" (song), a song on  Armor For Sleep's 2007 album Smile For Them
Williamsburg (yacht), a presidential yacht
"Williamsburg", nickname for the right field bleachers at Fenway Park during the ballplaying career of Ted Williams

See also
Williamsburgh (disambiguation)
Williamsburg Township (disambiguation)
Williamsburg County, South Carolina
Williamsburg Bridge, in New York City